Joel Kwiatkowski (born March 22, 1977) is a Canadian former professional ice hockey defenceman. Kwiatkowski played 282 games in the National Hockey League (NHL).

Playing career
Kwiatkowski was drafted in the eighth round, 194th overall by the Dallas Stars in the 1996 NHL Entry Draft.  After finishing junior hockey, he signed with the Mighty Ducks of Anaheim as a free-agent, but never played in the NHL for the Ducks, instead he spent two seasons with the Cincinnati Mighty Ducks of the American Hockey League.  He was traded to the Ottawa Senators for Patrick Traverse in 2000 and played a handful of games with the Sens.  As well as that, he was a key player in the IHL with the Grand Rapids Griffins, becoming an all-star in 2001.

After three seasons with the Senators organization, he was traded to the Washington Capitals for a ninth-round draft pick in the 2003 draft (a draft pick traded back to Washington just months later).  He played much more ice time in his one full season with the Capitals, playing 80 games and scoring 6 goals and 12 points.  He signed with the Florida Panthers in 2004, but spent the season with the San Antonio Rampage due to the NHL Lockout which cancelled the 2004–05 season.  He was later loaned to the St. John's Maple Leafs for a run in the playoffs.  When the lock-out was resolved, he finally played for the Panthers and in 73 games, he tied his NHL best of 12 points and scored 10 points in 41 games before being dealt to the Pittsburgh Penguins where he played just one game.

He signed with the Atlanta Thrashers on August 30, 2007 as a free-agent and was assigned to the Chicago Wolves. He played one season in Chicago before going to the Kontinental Hockey League where he spent the 2008–09 season playing for the Severstal Cherepovets. He remained in the KHL for the 2009–10 season with SKA St. Petersburg.

Kwiatkowski moved to the Swiss National League and first played for SC Bern from 2010–2012 before transferring to HC Fribourg-Gottéron for the 2012–13 season compiling 23 points in 46 games.

In his final professional season in 2015–16, Kwiatkowski opted to play in the Swedish Hockey League with Modo Hockey. Unable to help Modo avoid relegation, he produced 5 points in 42 games from the blueline.

On September 12, 2016, Kwiatkowski confirmed the end of his playing career in accepting an assistant coaching position with the Kalamazoo Wings of the ECHL.

International play

Kwiatkowski was a member of Team Canada at the 2009 IIHF World Championship in Switzerland. Named to the alternate roster on April 13, 2009, Team Canada GM Doug Armstrong activated the journeyman defenceman to suit up for the tournament game against Slovakia on April 28, 2009.

Career statistics

Regular season and playoffs

International

Awards and achievements
 Named to the WHL West Second All-Star Team in 1997
 Named to the WHL West First All-Star Team in 1998

References

External links

The National Post: Article April 27, 2009

1977 births
Atlanta Thrashers players
SC Bern players
Binghamton Senators players
Canadian ice hockey defencemen
Chicago Wolves players
Cincinnati Mighty Ducks players
Dallas Stars draft picks
Florida Panthers players
HC Fribourg-Gottéron players
Grand Rapids Griffins players
Sportspeople from Kindersley
Kelowna Rockets players
Living people
Modo Hockey players
Ottawa Senators players
Pittsburgh Penguins players
Prince George Cougars players
St. John's Maple Leafs players
San Antonio Rampage players
Severstal Cherepovets players
SKA Saint Petersburg players
Tacoma Rockets players
Washington Capitals players
Ice hockey people from Saskatchewan
Canadian expatriate ice hockey players in Russia
Canadian expatriate ice hockey players in Switzerland
Canadian expatriate ice hockey players in Sweden